Samuel W. Trott (March 1859 – June 5, 1925) was an American professional baseball player and manager whose career spanned from 1877 to 1891.  He played eight seasons in Major League Baseball, principally as a catcher, for the Boston Red Caps (1880), Detroit Wolverines (1881–83), and Baltimore Orioles (1884–85, 1887–88).  Trott also served as the manager the Washington Statesmen for their inaugural season in 1891.

Early years
Trott was born in Maryland in 1859.  His father, Samuel E. Trott, was a Maryland native and a carpenter.  His mother, Laura J. Trott, was also a Maryland native.

Professional baseball

Playing career

Minor leagues
Trott began his professional baseball career in 1877 playing for the Chicago Fairbanks and Philadelphia Athletic clubs in the League Alliance.  In 1879, he played for the Washington Nationals.

Boston Red Caps
In May 1880, Trott was purchased from the Nationals by the Boston Red Caps of the National League where he made his major league debut.  He appeared in 39 games for the Red Caps, 36 as a catcher, and compiled a .208 batting average.

Detroit Wolverines
In 1881, he joined the newly formed Detroit Wolverines in the National League.  He played for the Wolverines in their first three seasons from 1881 to 1883, serving principally as a backup to catcher Charlie Bennett, though he also played 42 games at second base in 1883.  In his three seasons with the Wolverines, Trott appeared in 113 games and compiled a .241 batting average with 23 doubles, three triples and 43 runs batted in.

Baltimore Orioles
Trott concluded his major league career by playing four seasons, principally as a catcher, for the Baltimore Orioles.  He spent the 1884, 1885, 1887 and 1888 seasons with the Orioles, appeared in 208 games, and compiled a .262 batting average with 46 doubles, 18 triples, three home runs, 71 RBIs, and nine stolen bases.

Managerial career
In 1891, Trott served as the first manager of the Washington Statesmen.  In their inaugural season, the Statesmen compiled a 44-91 record and finished ninth (last place) in American Association.  Trott was handicapped as a manager by having a pitching staff that compiled a 4.83 earned run average, far above the league average of 3.71.

Later years
By 1900, Trott was living with his wife Emma in Baltimore.  They had two children then living with them, Bessie (born August 1890) and Samuel (born March 1900).  Trott's occupation was listed as a cigar salesman. Ten years later, Trott was still living in Baltimore with wife, Emma, and they by then had three children, Bessie, Samuel and Dorothy. His occupation in 1910 was traveling salesman.  Trott died in Catonsville, Maryland, in June 1925 at the age of 66.

References

Baseball players from Maryland
Boston Red Caps players
Detroit Wolverines players
Baltimore Orioles (AA) players
Washington Statesmen managers
1859 births
1925 deaths
Minor league baseball managers
Philadelphia Athletic players
Chicago Fairbanks players
Washington Nationals (minor league) players
Nationals of Washington players
Albany (minor league baseball) players
Newark Domestics players
Newark Little Giants players
Des Moines Prohibitionists players
19th-century baseball players